is a Japanese footballer who plays as a defender for Nadeshiko League club Urawa Reds Ladies and for the Japan women's national team.

International goals

References

2000 births
Living people
Japanese women's footballers
Women's association football defenders
Urawa Red Diamonds Ladies players
Nadeshiko League players
Japan women's international footballers